This is the list of North American species in the genus Phyllotreta, of which there are over 300 species worldwide.

 Phyllotreta aeneicollis (Crotch, 1873)
 Phyllotreta aerea Allard, 1859
 Phyllotreta alberta Chittenden, 1927
 Phyllotreta albionica (J. L. LeConte, 1857)  (cabbage flea beetle)
 Phyllotreta arcuata E. Smith, 1985
 Phyllotreta armoraciae (Koch, 1803)  (horseradish flea beetle)
 Phyllotreta attenuata E. Smith, 1985
 Phyllotreta bipustulata E. Smith, 1985  (woodland flea beetle)
 Phyllotreta bisinuata E. Smith, 1985
 Phyllotreta brevipennis Chittenden, 1927
 Phyllotreta chalybeipennis (Crotch, 1873)
 Phyllotreta conjuncta Gentner, 1924
 Phyllotreta constricta E. Smith, 1985
 Phyllotreta cruciferae (Goeze, 1777)  (crucifer flea beetle)
 Phyllotreta decipiens Horn, 1889
 Phyllotreta denticornis Horn, 1889
 Phyllotreta dolichophalla E. Smith, 1985
 Phyllotreta emarginata E. Smith, 1985
 Phyllotreta fulgida Chittenden, 1927
 Phyllotreta herbacea Chittenden, 1927
 Phyllotreta inconspicua Chittenden, 1927
 Phyllotreta inordinata Chittenden, 1927
 Phyllotreta laticornis Chittenden, 1927
 Phyllotreta lepidula (J. L. LeConte, 1857)
 Phyllotreta lewisii (Crotch, 1873)
 Phyllotreta liebecki Schaeffer, 1919
 Phyllotreta lindahli Dury, 1906
 Phyllotreta oblonga Chittenden, 1927
 Phyllotreta obtusa Chittenden, 1927
 Phyllotreta oregonensis (Crotch, 1873)
 Phyllotreta ovalis (Blatchley, 1921)
 Phyllotreta perspicua Chittenden, 1927
 Phyllotreta polita Chittenden, 1927
 Phyllotreta prasina Chittenden, 1927
 Phyllotreta punctulata (Marsham, 1802)  (radish flea beetle)
 Phyllotreta pusilla Horn, 1889  (western black flea beetle)
 Phyllotreta ramosa (Crotch, 1874)  (western striped flea beetle)
 Phyllotreta ramosoides E. Smith, 1985
 Phyllotreta robusta J. L. LeConte, 1878  (garden flea beetle)
 Phyllotreta spatulata E. Smith, 1985
 Phyllotreta striolata (Fabricius, 1801)  (striped flea beetle)
 Phyllotreta subnitida Chittenden, 1927
 Phyllotreta transversovalis Chittenden, 1927
 Phyllotreta ulkei Horn, 1889
 Phyllotreta undulata (Kutschera, 1860)  (small striped flea beetle)
 Phyllotreta utanula E. Smith, 1985
 Phyllotreta viridicyanea Chittenden, 1927
 Phyllotreta zimmermanni (Crotch, 1873)  (Zimmerman's flea beetle)

References